DXSY (1242 AM) is a radio station owned and operated by Times Broadcasting Network Corporation. The station's studio is located along Don Mariano Marcos Ave., Ozamiz.

References

Radio stations in Misamis Occidental
News and talk radio stations in the Philippines
Radio stations established in 1975